Brandon Vincent (born May 1, 1994) is a former American professional soccer player who played as a defender for the Chicago Fire in Major League Soccer. Vincent grew up playing in the U.S. Soccer Development Academy for Real So Cal.

Career
After spending four years with Stanford Cardinal at Stanford University, Vincent was drafted as the fourth overall pick in the 2016 MLS SuperDraft by the Chicago Fire. Chicago acquired the pick and General Allocation Money from NYCFC in exchange for Jack Harrison. He was named to the MLS All-Star team in his first season.  On July 5, 2017, Vincent scored his first professional MLS goal against Portland Timbers. On October 30, 2018, Vincent announced, via Twitter, his retirement from professional soccer.

International
On February 5, 2016, Vincent made his international debut for the United States, coming on as a halftime substitute against Canada.

Career statistics

References

External links 
 

1994 births
Living people
All-American men's college soccer players
American soccer players
Association football defenders
Chicago Fire FC draft picks
Chicago Fire FC players
NCAA Division I Men's Soccer Tournament Most Outstanding Player winners
People from Valencia, Santa Clarita, California
Portland Timbers U23s players
Soccer players from Los Angeles
Stanford Cardinal men's soccer players
Major League Soccer All-Stars
Major League Soccer players
United States men's international soccer players
USL League Two players
Ventura County Fusion players